

Ernst Teodorovich Krenkel (in Białystok – 8 December 1971 in Moscow) was a Soviet Arctic explorer, radio operator, doctor of geographical sciences (1938), and Hero of the Soviet Union (1938). Amateur radio callsigns: U3AA, UA3AA, RAEM.

Publications
 Ernst Krenkel. (1937). Four Russians at North Pole Get Together Once a Day. The Science News-Letter, 32(865), 300–300. 
 Ernst Krenkel. (1937). Ice Floe of Polar Scientists No Longer Is Northernmost. The Science News-Letter, 32(872), 407–408.
 Ernst Krenkel. (1978). RAEM is my call-sign. — Moscow: Progress Publishers. (English edition of memoirs.)

Bibliography
 Ananyev, A. (2021). Heroes of the Ice: The Polar Explorer and the Ice Hockey Player as Two Masculine Identity Scripts of the Soviet Era. In J. Herzberg, A. Renner, & I. Schierle (Eds.), The Russian Cold: Histories of Ice, Frost, and Snow (1st ed., Vol. 22, pp. 226–248). Berghahn Books.
 McCannon, J. (1995). To storm the Arctic: Soviet polar exploration and public visions of nature in the USSR, 1932-1939. Ecumene, 2(1), 15–31. 
 McCannon, J. (1997). Positive Heroes at the Pole: Celebrity Status, Socialist-Realist Ideals and the Soviet Myth of the Arctic, 1932-39. The Russian Review, 56(3), 346–365.

References

External links
 Эрнст Теодорович Кренкель — электронные копии книги Э. Т. Кренкеля RAEM — мои позывные и воспоминаний о нём на сайте «VIVOS VOCO!»
 Video: 

1903 births
1971 deaths
20th-century Russian people
People from Białystok
Communist Party of the Soviet Union members
First convocation members of the Supreme Soviet of the Soviet Union
Heroes of the Soviet Union
Recipients of the Order of Lenin
Recipients of the Order of the Red Banner of Labour
Recipients of the Order of the Red Star
Amateur radio people
Explorers of the Arctic
Radio in the Soviet Union
Baltic-German people
Russian and Soviet polar explorers
Russian explorers
Russian memoirists
Russian people of German descent
Russian philatelists
Russian radio personalities
Soviet people of German descent

Soviet polar explorers
Soviet memoirists
Burials at Novodevichy Cemetery